Shane McEntee may refer to:

 Shane McEntee (Gaelic footballer), Irish Gaelic footballer who plays for Meath
 Shane McEntee (politician) (1956–2012), Irish Fine Gael politician and uncle of the Gaelic footballer